Spirit in the System is the second studio album from British band The Qemists. The album was released on 7 July 2010 under record label Ninja Tune. On 26 May 2010, the band announced the album was complete. The album artwork was created by Glenn Fabry.

On 14 June 2012, the band announced they had completed the music video for the single "Hurt Less" featuring Jenna G. The video was directed by Keith McCarthy.

Track list

Personnel
The Qemists
 Dan Arnold – bass, synths
 Leon Harris – drums
 Liam Black – guitar, synths

Additional musicians
 Rou Reynolds – vocals (on "Take It Back")
 Rory Clewlow – guitar (on "Take It Back")
 Jenna G – vocals (on "Hurt Less")
 Matt Rose – vocals (on "Dirty Words" and "Your Revolution")
 Bruno Balanta – vocals (on "Dirty Words")
 Maxsta – vocals (on "Renegade")
 Chantal Brown – vocals (on "Fading Halo" and "Life's Too Short")
 MC I.D. – vocals (on "Renegade" and "The Only Love Song")
 Robin Hawkins – vocals (on "Apocalypse")
 Sebastian Wolff – vocals (on "Bones")
 Michael Salmon – piano

Technical personnel
 The Qemists – production, engineering
 Harry Barnard – additional production (on "Take It Back" and "Renegade")
 Kellermensch – additional production (on "Bones") 
 Beau Thomas – mastering
 Jack Noel – design
 Glenn Fabry – cover image

Release history

References

2010 albums
The Qemists albums